Henri Caron (born 17 July 1906, date of death unknown) was a French racing cyclist. He rode in the 1927 Tour de France.

References

1906 births
Year of death missing
French male cyclists
Place of birth missing